I Was a Male War Bride is a 1949 comedy film directed by Howard Hawks and starring Cary Grant and Ann Sheridan.

The film was based on "Male War Bride Trial to Army", a biography of Henri Rochard (pen name of Roger Charlier), a Belgian who married an American nurse.

The film is about French Army officer Henri Rochard (Grant) who must pass as a war bride in order to go back to the United States with Women's Army Corps officer Catherine Gates (Sheridan).

Plot
In Heidelberg in post-World War II Allied-occupied Germany, French Army Captain Henri Rochard is given the task of recruiting a highly skilled lens maker named Schindler. He is assigned American Lieutenant Catherine Gates as his driver, much to their mutual discomfort (arising from several prior clashes). The only available transportation is a motorcycle which, due to Army regulations, only Catherine is allowed to drive; Henri has to ride in the sidecar. After several mishaps, the constantly quarreling couple arrive at their destination, Bad Nauheim.

At the hotel, bothered by back pain, Catherine warily accepts Henri's offer of a back rub. When she falls asleep, he tries to leave her room, but the exterior door handle falls off, trapping him inside. He spends an uncomfortable night in a chair. In the morning, she refuses to believe his story. Unknown to him, the innkeeper's wife has replaced the exterior knob, so when he tells Catherine to see for herself how the door will not open, it does. Eventually, the innkeeper's wife comes to the room, forcing Henri to hide on the ledge outside the window. The innkeeper's wife explains everything to Catherine, but not before Henri falls off the ledge.

Later, Henri goes undercover to search for Schindler, now working in the black market. He refuses to let Catherine help him and tells her that if she sees him to pretend she does not know him. The black market is raided by the authorities, and he is rounded up with everyone else. When he asks her to vouch for his identity, she obeys his earlier order not to reveal that she knows him. While he is in jail, she finds Schindler, who is happy to leave Germany and ply his trade in France. Later, she apologizes to a furious Henri, and by the time they return to Heidelberg, they have fallen in love.

Red tape forces Henri and Catherine to be married first in a civil ceremony before they can each have their choice of ceremony: Army chaplain (Catherine) and church (Henri). Before they can consummate their marriage, she is ordered to report immediately to headquarters in the morning; her unit has been alerted they are about to be shipped back to the United States. They subsequently learn that the only way Henri can get a visa is under the War Brides Act as the spouse of an American soldier. After many misunderstandings, he is given permission to accompany her, but circumstances and Army regulations conspire to keep them from spending the night together.

When they try to board the transport ship, Navy sailors do not believe that Henri is a war "bride". He is forced to dress as a female Army nurse to get aboard. The deception works, but once underway, his disguise is discovered and he is arrested. Catherine manages to straighten out the situation, and they finally have some privacy - in the ship's brig.

Cast

 Cary Grant as Capt. Henri Rochard
 Ann Sheridan as Lt. Catherine Gates
 Marion Marshall as Lt. Kitty Lawrence
 Randy Stuart as Lt. Eloise Billings (Mae)
 William Neff as Capt. Jack Rumsey
 Eugene Gericke as Tony Jowitt
 Ruben Wendorf as Innkeeper's Assistant
 Lester Sharpe as Walter
 John Whitney as Trumble
 Kenneth Tobey as Seaman
 Robert Stevenson as Lieutenant
 Alfred Linder as Bartender
 David McMahon as Chaplain
 Joe Haworth as Shore Patrol
 Gil Herman as Naval Officer
 Lily Kann as Innkeeper's Wife
 Harry Lauter as Lieutenant
 Alex Gerry as Waiter
 André Charlot as French Minister
 Russ Conway as Cmdr. Willis
 Mike Mahoney as Sailor
 William McLean as Expectant GI
 Paul Hardtmuth as Burgermeister
 Barbara Perry as Tall WAC
 William Pullen as Sergeant
 Otto Reichow
 Bill Self as Sergeant
 John Serret as French Notary
 Martin Miller as Schindler
 William Murphy as Sergeant
 William Yetter, Jr. as German Policeman
 John Zilly as Shore Patrol
 Kay Young as Maj. Prendergast
 Robert Nichols as Sergeant (uncredited film debut)

 Eleanor Audley as Assignment Officer (uncredited)

Production 
Filming began on September 28, 1948 and lasted more than eight months due to a variety of illnesses contracted by cast members and crew. Sheridan contracted pleurisy that developed into pneumonia, suspending shooting for two weeks. Hawks broke out in unexplained hives all over his body. Grant came down with hepatitis complicated by jaundice, and production was shut down for three months, until Grant recovered and regained around 30 pounds. When screenwriter Charles Lederer was ill, his friend Orson Welles wrote part of a short chase scene as a favor to him. The delay in production pushed the budget over $2 million.

Filming took place primarily in Heidelberg, Germany, London at Shepperton Studios, and Los Angeles at the 20th Century Fox studios. King Donovan, Charles B. Fitzsimons, Robert Stevenson, and Otto Waldis all shot scenes for this film, but all of them were ultimately deleted.

Reception 
[[Image:Werner Haberkorn - Cine Bink - Campinas.jpg|thumb|In Brazil, the movie was released as A Noiva era Ele]]
The film played Grauman's Chinese Theatre for two weeks starting August 19, 1949. Its New York premiere was on August 26, 1949, at the Roxy Theatre. The opening was originally scheduled for Radio City Music Hall, but filming delays placed the opening in conflict with the Music Hall's schedule.

Bosley Crowther of The New York Times wrote a generally positive review, finding that a "tediously long time" was spent setting up the plot but that the film's best scenes were "convulsingly zany stuff". Variety was also mostly positive, calling the film "a smash combo of saucy humor and slapstick", though it thought that the story had "trouble finding a point at which to end." Harrison's Reports called it "An hilariously funny sophisticated comedy ... The direction is bright and snappy, and both Grant and Sheridan do very good work, romping through the farcical situations in a highly amusing way." Richard L. Coe of The Washington Post wrote that there were "a good many laughs" in the film, though he found too many of the comedic situations to consist of "the obvious worked to death". Philip Hamburger of The New Yorker was negative, writing, "One cannot blame Miss Sheridan for the accumulated inanities to which she is subjected (the antics in this film are too childish to bear enumeration), but she does as little with them as humanly possible."

The film holds a score of 79% on review aggregation website Rotten Tomatoes based on 11 out of 14 surveyed critics giving it a positive review.

The film grossed over $4.5 million, making it 20th's biggest earner of 1949. It was also Howard Hawks' 3rd highest grosser to that time, behind only Sergeant York (1941) and Red River'' (1948).

References

External links

 
 
 
 

1949 films
1949 romantic comedy films
1940s screwball comedy films
20th Century Fox films
American black-and-white films
American romantic comedy films
American screwball comedy films
Cross-dressing in American films
1940s English-language films
Films directed by Howard Hawks
Films scored by Cyril J. Mockridge
Films shot in Germany
Films set in Germany
Military humor in film
Films with screenplays by Charles Lederer
Films shot in Los Angeles
Films produced by Sol C. Siegel
1940s American films